Ratyauli is a traditional Nepalese event performed in the bride or groom's house in the wedding evening by female relatives and guests. Male are strictly prohibited in the event. In the event, women play games, sing traditional songs and dance which has some explicit content. In modern times, Ratyauli events are organized in public places as well.

Proceedings
The traditional Ratyauli is organized in three parts based on the sequence of marriage. In the first part, songs are sang describing the events before the groom comes to take the bride in her house. In the middle part, songs describe the event from wedding to the time when groom takes the bride to his home. It also describes the relationship between in-laws and new bride. In this section, the explicit part is sang. In the end part, songs describe the best wishes to the new couple by praying to gods and goddesses.

See also
Dohori, traditional music of Nepal

References

Nepalese culture
Dance in Nepal
Marriage in Nepal
Nepalese folk music
Culture of Bagmati
Culture of Gandaki
Culture of Lumbini
Nepalese musical genres